The 1936 LFF Lyga was the 15th season of the LFF Lyga football competition in Lithuania.  It was contested by 8 teams, and Kovas Kaunas won the championship.

League standings

References
RSSSF

LFF Lyga seasons
Lith
Lith
1